

Mechanical temperature sensors
 Thermometer
 Therm

Electrical temperature sensors
 Thermistor- Thermistors are thermally sensitive resistors whose prime function is to exhibit a large, predictable and precise change in electrical resistance when subjected to a corresponding change in body temperature. Negative Temperature Coefficient (NTC) thermistors exhibit a decrease in electrical resistance when subjected to an increase in body temperature and Positive Temperature Coefficient (PTC) thermistors exhibit an increase in electrical resistance when subjected to an increase in body temperature.
 Thermocouple
 Resistance thermometer
 Silicon bandgap temperature sensor

Integrated circuit sensors 

The integrated circuit sensors may come in a variety of interfaces — analogue or digital; for digital, these could be Serial Peripheral Interface, SMBus/I2C or 1-Wire.

In OpenBSD, many of the I2C temperature sensors from the below list have been supported and are accessible through the generalised hardware sensors framework since OpenBSD 3.9 (2006), which has also included an ad-hoc method of automatically scanning the I2C bus by default during system boot since 2006 as well.

In NetBSD, many of these I2C sensors are also supported and are accessible through the envsys framework, although none are enabled by default outside of Open Firmware architectures like macppc, and a manual configuration is required before first use on i386 or amd64.

Remote uncooled IR thermal radiometer sensors are also commonly used in integrated circuits.

List 
Non-exhaustive list of products classified by manufacturer.

Legend
 Manufacturer : IC Manufacturer
 Part Number : IC Part Number
 Output Type : We can find 3 different Output types : Analog, Digital and Switch
 Designation : IC Designation
 Temperature Range : Die temperature range where the IC can operate.
 Accuracy (Typical) : Typical IC accuracy
 Accuracy (Max) : Maximum IC accuracy
 Linear Temperature Slope : Linear temperature slope (available for Analog output ICs). Generally expressed in μA/°C or mV/°C Units
 Input Voltage Range : Input voltage range where the IC can operate
 Supply Current : IC supply current
 Output Voltage Range : Output voltage range (available for some Analog output ICs). It generally depends on the temperature range and the linear temperature slope values.
 Package : IC package(s) Availability
 Datasheet : Manufacturer's datasheet link

Table
Contents are extract from the manufacturer datasheet. Each manufacturer may have different method with different accuracy processes, so it can be difficult to compare these self-reported values directly.

See also 
 Celsius, Fahrenheit, Kelvin
 Conversion of units of temperature
 List of LM-series integrated circuits

References

Sensors
Temperature sensors